Kasare, is a small village in Ahmednagar district of Maharashtra, India. This village is located about equidistant between Talegaon to the northwest and Gogalgaon to the southeast on State Highway 45.

Demographics 
In the 2001 census, the village of Kasare had 1,417 inhabitants, with 726 males (51.2%) and 691 females (48.8%), for a gender ratio of 952 females per thousand males.

In the 2011 census, the village of Kasare had 1,776 inhabitants, for a net gain of 359 over the preceding decade.

Religion
The majority of the population in Kasare is Hindu. There are several temples in the village, including the Kalika Mata Temple, the Hanumanji Temple, and the Gurdev Datta Temple.

References 

Villages in Ahmednagar district